The University of California, Davis College of Biological Sciences (commonly referred to by students as the CBS) was established in 2005 and is one of four colleges and five schools on the campus of the University of California, Davis. Davis is the only UC campus that boasts a college dedicated solely to the study of biology, and is one of the only universities in the US to have such an institution. The college offers ten undergraduate majors and six minors, and has eight interdisciplinary graduate groups. The majors housed in the CBS were previously part of the Division of Biological Sciences since 1971.

In 2016, Mark Winey became Dean of the college.

UC Davis' biology programs are consistently ranked in the top ten in the nation, with its Genetics and Evolution and Ecology programs frequently ranked as best in the U.S.

Biological Sciences is the second most popular major at UC Davis, and 1/4 of the students at the university are within the CBS. Three of the top ten most popular majors at UC Davis are in the College of Biological Sciences: Biological Sciences; Neurobiology, Physiology and Behavior; and Biochemistry and Molecular Biology.  

In addition, the National Sciences Federation has ranked UC Davis #1 among UC campuses and #13 nationwide for funding on the biology field.

References

External links 
 

Biological Sciences, College of
Educational institutions established in 2005
2005 establishments in California